Headline News or HLN is an American television news network.

Headline News may also refer to:

 Headline News (album) or the title song, by Atomic Rooster, 1983
 "Headline News" ("Weird Al" Yankovic song), 1994
Headline News (Everyday People song), 1990
 "Headline News", a song by Edwin Starr, 1966
 Sky News Breakfast, formerly Headline News, an Australian television program broadcast on Sky News Regional

See also
 Headline, in newspapers, text indicating the nature of the article below
 All Headline News, a US-based news agency, 2000–2010
 CNN Philippines Headline News, an English-language morning newscast, 2015–2016
 GMA Headline News, a Philippine television newscast on GMA Network, 1986–1992